Denneshsing Baboolall (born 11 May 1984) is a Mauritian male badminton player.

Achievements

African Badminton Championships 
Men's Doubles

Mixed Doubles

BWF International Challenge/Series
Men's Singles

Men's Doubles

Mixed Doubles

 BWF International Challenge tournament
 BWF International Series tournament
 BWF Future Series tournament

References

External links
 

1984 births
Living people
Mauritian people of Indian descent
Mauritian male badminton players
Badminton players at the 2006 Commonwealth Games
Commonwealth Games competitors for Mauritius
Competitors at the 2011 All-Africa Games
African Games bronze medalists for Mauritius
African Games medalists in badminton